Rama Prabha  is an Indian actress who performs in Telugu, Tamil and Hindi films. She has acted in more than 1,400 films and is credited as a character artist who shared screen space with superstars across all generation of South Indian Cinema with a career spanning over six decades. She formed a noted pair on Telugu screen during the 1970s and 1980s with comedian Raja Babu. She acted opposite Nagesh in Shanti Nilayam and many other films from 1968 onwards.  She acted in Hindi opposite Mehmood in the movie Do Phool.

Personal life 
When she was two months old, her aunty adopted her and they shifted to Ooty. Rama's childhood was spent in that place up to 14 years then they shifted to Chennai.
Currently lives in Vayalpadu, near Madanapalle.

She had adopted her sister's daughter  Vijaya Chamundeswari, when she was a 1-year-old child. Vijaya is married to actor Rajendra Prasad

Selected filmography

Awards
 She won Nandi Award for Best Female Comedian - Lahiri Lahiri Lahirilo (2002)

References

External links

 TELUGU ACTRESS ACTED IN MOST NUMBER OF FILMS | telugu book
 Actor's wife comes to court seeking divorce | Chennai News - Times of India
 Actress Ramaprabha in Open Heart with RK -9th Dec | ManaTelugu.in : Movies | Shows | Serials | News | Galleries and Many More
 Actress Ramaprabha in Open Heart with RK -9th Dec | ManaTelugu.in : Movies | Shows | Serials | News | Galleries and Many More
 Actor's wife comes to court seeking divorce | Chennai News - Times of India

Actresses from Andhra Pradesh
Telugu actresses
Actresses in Tamil cinema
Living people
Telugu comedians
Nandi Award winners
People from Anantapur district
Indian film actresses
Actresses in Telugu cinema
Actresses in Hindi cinema
20th-century Indian actresses
21st-century Indian actresses
Indian women comedians
1946 births